Dahl may refer to:

Dal (or dahl, or dhal), a dish or preparation of lentils or other pulses

Places

Germany
Hagen-Dahl, Hagen, Ruhrgebiet
Kürten-Dahl, Kürten, Rheinisch-Bergischer Kreis
Marienheide-Dahl, Marienheide, Oberbergischer Kreis
Mönchengladbach-Dahl, Mönchengladbach
Dahl, a location in Olpe, Germany
Paderborn-Dahl, Paderborn
Dahl, Solingen
Waldbröl-Dahl, Waldbröl, Oberbergischer Kreis
Dahl, Wiehl, Oberbergischer Kreis
Dahl, Wipperfürth, Oberbergischer Kreis

Luxembourg
Dahl, a village in the commune of Goesdorf

People
Dahl (surname), includes a list of people with that name
Roald Dahl (1916–1990), British author
Robert A. Dahl (1915–2014), American political scientist

Fiction
Dahl is a sector of the fictional planet Trantor
Dahl is a corporation in the video game series Borderlands

See also
Dal (disambiguation)
Daal (disambiguation)